Campbell County Public Schools can refer to:
Campbell County Public Schools (Tennessee), a school district in Tennessee
Campbell County Public Schools (Virginia), a school district in Virginia
Campbell County Schools, a school district in Kentucky
Campbell County School District Number 1, a school district in Wyoming